Worrorra, also written Worora and other variants, and also known as  Western Worrorran, is a moribund Australian Aboriginal language of northern Western Australia. It encompasses a number of dialects, which are spoken by a group of people known as the Worrorra people.

It is one of a group of Worrorran languages, the other two being Wunambal and Ngarinyin.

Dialects of (western) Worrorra
Worrorra is a dialect cluster; Bowern (2011) recognises five languages: Worrorra proper, Unggumi, Yawijibaya, Unggarranggu, and Umiida. McGregor and Rumsey (2009) include the above dialects and also include Winyjarrumi (Winjarumi), describing Worrorra as a non-Pama-Nyungan language of the Worrorran group of languages known properly as western Worrorran.

Umiida, Unggarrangu, Unggumi,  and Yawijibaya peoples are described in separate articles.

An alleged Maialnga language was a reported clan name of Worrorra proper that could not be confirmed with speakers.

Notable people
Elkin Umbagai was a translator between English and Worrorra.

Sounds

 A nasal occurring before a  stop consonant, is then realised as a prenasalized voiced stop sound (ex. [ŋɡ]).
 /r/ can be heard as a trill or a flap, and is typically only voiced when preceding a sonorant, voiced phoneme, or lateral consonant. Elsewhere, it is voiceless as [r̥], or can be heard in free variation.
/j/ can also be heard as a fricative sound [ç] in word-initial positions.

Worrorra vowel inventory

 Long vowel sounds are noted as follows: /iː, ɛː, uː, ɔː, ɑː/.
 In between consonant clusters, an epenthetic vowel sound [ʉ̆] ~ [ɨ̆] occurs when breaking them up. Sometimes it can also be heard as a central vowel sound [ɨ].

Sign language
The Worora have (or at one point had) a signed form of their language, used for speaking to kin in certain taboo relationships, but it is not clear from records that it was particularly well developed compared to other Australian Aboriginal sign languages.

References

Further reading

Worrorran languages
Endangered indigenous Australian languages in Western Australia